Ctenodes is a genus of beetles in the family Cerambycidae, containing the following species:

 Ctenodes decemmaculata Olivier, 1807
 Ctenodes geniculata Klug, 1825
 Ctenodes guianensis Dalens, Tavakilian & Touroult, 2009
 Ctenodes zonata Klug, 1825

References

Trachyderini
Cerambycidae genera